Lukas Schmidt (born 19 September 1988) is a German badminton player. He was a bronze medalist at the 2007 European Junior Championships in the boys' doubles event with Peter Käsbauer. Schmidt was a champions at the 2012 and 2014 Croatian International in the men's singles event.

Achievements

European Junior Championships 
Boys' doubles

BWF International Challenge/Series 
Men's singles

  BWF International Challenge tournament
  BWF International Series tournament
  BWF Future Series tournament

References

External links 
 

1988 births
Living people
Sportspeople from Regensburg
German male badminton players